Hendrika Lena "Heleen" Murre-van den Berg (born 1964) is a scholar of Eastern Christianity, who holds a chair in Global Christianity at Radboud University.

She is a member of the Royal Netherlands Academy of Arts and Science. She won the 2017 Hans Sigrist Prize.

Works

References

1964 births
Living people
Scholars of Syriac Christianity
Academic staff of Radboud University Nijmegen
Members of the Royal Netherlands Academy of Arts and Sciences